Parydra fossarum is a species of fly in the family Ephydridae. It is found in the  Palearctic. May to December. Associated with wetland or coastal habitats.

References

External links
Images representing Parydra at BOLD

Ephydridae
Insects described in 1833
Brachyceran flies of Europe